Stimmwerck is a male classical music vocal quartet ensemble specializing in the rediscovery and reproduction of the music of little known renaissance composers of the German-speaking world.

History
Stimmwerck was founded in Munich, Germany in 2001, by four specialists in classical vocal ensemble singing; the two tenors, Gerhard Hölzle and Klaus Wenk, bass singer Marcus Schmidl, and counter tenor Franz Vitzthum.

Purpose
Their name reflects the ensemble's structure and purpose.  "Stimmwerck" comes from a 16th-century German term often used (for example, by Michael Praetorius) for a group of instruments of the same type but of different ranges, similar to the English term "consort of instruments".  Thus, the ensemble is a “Stimmwerck” of classically trained male voices in varying ranges, attuned to one another in skill.

The focus of their work together is the bringing of forgotten or less well known renaissance composers of early music in the German-speaking regions once again into public recognition.  To achieve this, they collaborate extensively with musicologists such as Ian Rumbold, Inga Mai Groote, and Katelijne Schiltz and actively engage in research. The results take form as recordings, public performance in concerts, on tour and at early music festivals, and as their own 3-day annual festival in August, the Stimmwercktage, on the Adlersberg near Regensburg, Germany, which is broadcast each year by Bayerischer Rundfunk.

Recordings 
Stimmwerck records with Christophorus Records, Aeolus and Cavalli Records, among others, and has received praise for their work from the critical press. Their first compact disks, with works by Heinrich Finck (1445–1527), and Adam of Fulda (1444–1505), each received the highest possible rating of 5 stars in “Goldberg Magazine”.

Discography 
 Heinrich Finck (1444–1527): Missa Dominicalis und Lieder (Cavalli Records), 2006*
 Adam von Fulda (ca. 1445–1505): Messe - Motetten - Lieder (Cavalli Records), 2007
 Musik in St Michael, Vol 3, (DD Medien, Inigomedien), 2007
 The St. Emmeram Codex (Aeolus (Note 1) ), 2008 - Their most recently released recording covers a late medieval repertoire taken from the Regensburg Codex St. Emmeram, and received praise from the musical press for the quality and importance of the music chosen as well as for the singing performances.
 Lassus, Gyri Gyri Gaga - Lust und Leben. with the instrumental ensemble “La Villanella Basel”. Christophorus Records 2010
 Leonhard Päminger, Sacred works . Christophorus Records 2011
 Susanne un jour - Lassus, Missa Susanne un jour and other works. Aeolus Records 2012

Live performance 
Stimmwerck give concerts both in Germany and abroad. They have been featured guests at
Laus Polyphoniae Antwerp
Bach Festival Leipzig
Vienna’s “Resonanzen” Festival of early music.

Festival: Stimmwercktage – Stimmwerck Days 
Since 2005, the ensemble holds an annual festival in early August named the “Stimmwercktage” (Stimmwerck Days) on the Adlersberg near Regensburg.  There, using such modern technology as laptops and projectors in place of paper manuscripts, the works of a particular renaissance composer are the subject of German language lectures by musicologists and performances by Stimmwerck.

In previous years, works by the following composers were examined:
 2008 Ludwig Senfl (1486-1542/43)
 2007 Anonymus
 2006 Leonhard Lechner (c.1553-1606)
 2005 Jacob Obrecht  (1457/1458 – late July, 1505)

External links 
Stimmwerck official site
Franz Vitzthum official site
Goldberg Foundation, partners

Videos 
StimmWercktage 2008
Mensuralcodex St. Emmeram, „Quam pulchra es“ with commentary by Ian Rumbold

References 

Vocal quartets
Early music choirs
German musical groups
Musical groups established in 2001